The French Alternative Energies and Atomic Energy Commission or CEA (French: Commissariat à l'énergie atomique et aux énergies alternatives), is a French public government-funded research organisation in the areas of energy, defense and security, information technologies and health technologies. The CEA maintains a cross-disciplinary culture of engineers and researchers, building on the synergies between fundamental and technological research.

CEA is headed by a board headed by the general administrator (currently François Jacq since 20 April 2018), advised by the high-commissioner for atomic energy (currently Patrick Landais). Its yearly budget amounts to €5.1 billion and its permanent staff is slightly over 20,500 persons. It owned Areva.

CEA was created in 1945; since then, the successive high-commissioners have been Frédéric Joliot-Curie, Francis Perrin, Jacques Yvon, Jean Teillac, Raoul Dautry, René Pellat, Bernard Bigot, Catherine Cesarsky, Daniel Verwaerde, and François Jacq.

It conducts fundamental and applied research into many areas, including the design of nuclear reactors, the manufacturing of integrated circuits, the use of radionucleides for curing illnesses, seismology and tsunami propagation, the safety of computerized systems, etc.

It has one of the top 100 supercomputers in the world, the Tera-100. TERA 100, first system designed and built in Europe to reach the petaflops in 2010, was ranked in 5th position in the worldwide TOP 500. CEA is now building TERA-1000 which is a key step in the implementation of their Exascale program for the computing needs that CEA would face by 2020.

In March 2016, Reuters published an article describing the "Top 25 Global Innovators – Government" and placed CEA as "number one" amongst "The World's Most Innovative Research Institutions."

Organisation 

CEA is divided into four directorates, or divisions:

Energies division (DES)

Technological research division (DRT) 
The CEA Tech division is divided between two CEA sites, at Saclay and Grenoble. CEA Tech focuses on technological research and development in the field of energy, IT and health care information. It plays an active role in transferring knowledge and research to industry.

The CEA Tech division is further divided into three labs:

 The CEA-Leti lab works mainly on micro/nano technologies and specializes in microsystems, biotech, photonics and nanoelectronics. It is located mainly in Grenoble, France.
 The CEA-List lab works mainly on systems and software-intensive technology and specializes in embedded systems, sensors and big data, and advanced manufacturing. It is located mainly in Paris-Saclay, France.
 The CEA-Liten lab works mainly on cutting edge technologies related to energy and nanomaterials. It specializes in building solar, carbon-free transports, biomass-hydrogen and nano materials-nanotechnologies.

Fundamental research division (DRF)

Military applications division (DAM) 

DAM builds the nuclear weapons of the French military and designs the power plants for the nuclear submarines of the French Navy.

In December 2009, French President Nicolas Sarkozy declared that CEA should change its name from Commissariat à l’énergie atomique to Commissariat à l’énergie atomique et aux énergies alternatives; this change took effect on 10 March 2010, when the decision was published in the French Official Journal.

Facilities

Civilian research centres
 CEA Saclay, Essonne (headquarters since 2006) and the associated National Laboratory GANIL at Caen - Calvados 
 CEA Fontenay-aux-Roses, Fontenay-aux-Roses, Hauts-de-Seine
 CEA Grenoble, Grenoble (Polygone Scientifique), Isère
 CEA Cadarache, Cadarache, Bouches-du-Rhône
 CEA Valrhô, Marcoule and Pierrelatte, Gard

Civilian emergency organizations
 Groupe INTRA

Research centres for military applications
 CEA DAM Île-de-France, Bruyères-le-Châtel, Essonne
 CEA Cesta, Gironde
 CEA Gramat
 CEA Valduc, Côte-d'Or
 CEA Le Ripault, Indre-et-Loire

Subsidiaries and minority interests
 Orano (4.8%)
 STMicroelectronics (2.87% indirectly)

CEA in Academics

University of Paris-Saclay 
CEA has played an active role in research, development and innovation in the four main areas of low-carbon energies (nuclear and renewable), technologies for information and health technologies, very large research infrastructures (TGIR), and defense and global security.

Moreover, two of the ten CEA centers across France have joined with the University of Paris-Saclay to develop high quality research and training. The centers which form a part of the University of Paris-Saclay are:
 CEA Saclay Center, which conducts research mainly in areas related to climate and environment, materials science, nuclear energy, life sciences and technological research
 CEA Fontenay aux Roses Center, which conducts research and innovation in areas related to imaging and biomedical technologies
The CEA researchers involved in the University of Paris-Saclay represent over 20% of the university's research potential, particularly in the field of physics and engineering. CEA maintains a strong presence in training to master and engineer level by administrating INSTN, wherein various courses are taught by its researchers.

CEA has around 400 researchers who hold an accreditation to supervise research, making it a significant contributor to the research and doctoral programs of the University Paris-Saclay.

INSTN 
The INSTN, Institut national des sciences et techniques nucléaires (National Institute for Nuclear Science and Technology) is a public higher education institution administered by the CEA (French Atomic Energy and Alternative Energies Commission) under the joint authority of the Ministry of National Education, Higher Education and Research, the Ministry of the Economy, Industry and the Digital Sector and the Ministry of the Environment, Energy and Marine Affairs.

Others 
 Atos, ENS Paris-Saclay and CEA launched an academic partnership in 2016.

See also 

 GANIL (laboratory shared between the CEA and the CNRS)
 Groupe INTRA
 Laser Mégajoule
 Pascal Elleaume

References

Bibliography 
 Bertrand Goldschmidt, Le Complexe atomique : histoire politique de l’énergie nucléaire, Fayard, 1980
 Gabrielle Hecht, Le rayonnement de la France : Énergie nucléaire et identité nationale après la Seconde Guerre mondiale, La Découverte, 2004
 Marie-José Lovérini, L’Atome de la recherche à l’industrie : le Commissariat à l’énergie atomique, Gallimard, 1996
 Jean-François Picard, Alain Beltran et Martine Bungener, Histoire de l’EDF : comment se sont prises les décisions de 1946 à nos jours, Dunod, 1985

 
Government agencies of France
Governmental nuclear organizations
Nuclear energy in France
Nuclear research institutes
Nuclear technology organizations of France
Paris-Saclay University